Allaretella is a genus of midges in the family Cecidomyiidae. Allartella germanica is the only described species in this genus. It has been recorded in Sweden, Latvia, Germany, and Austria. The genus was first described by Hans Meyer and Voldemars Spungis in 1994.

References

Cecidomyiidae genera
Monotypic Diptera genera
Insects described in 1994
Taxa named by Voldemars Spungis
Diptera of Europe